Forestry in Tasmania Australia has been conducted since early European settlement.

Early history

Forest conservation and reservation in the nineteenth century Tasmania was controlled under the title of the Waste Lands Act.

 Imperial Governments 1842 Act - enabled the Van Diemen's Land Governor was able to grant "Licences for the felling, removal and sale of timber from such lands"
 Waste Land Act (1863) - made it possible for further licensing for forest activities was possible after Van Diemen's Land become Tasmania in 1856.
 Waste Lands Act (1881) - provided for land reservation for the preservation of timber.  In 1885 the State Forests Act preservation and policing were not well organised and the management of forests was considered "chaotic".
 Crown Lands Act (1890) - saw the Crown Lands Act repealed and consolidated, along with the Waste Lands Act, and State Forests act of 1885.
 Forestry Act (1920) - established the Tasmania Forestry Department
 Kermandi Woodpulp and Paper Industry Act (1926)
 Florentine Valley Paper Industry Act (1932)

Troubles

The condition of the industry after the 1930s had created a situation where the following reports and commission attempted to resolve the issues:
 Galbraith Report 1940-1941
 Kessell report 1945
 Royal Commission of 1946

Resolution
 Forestry Commission 15 April 1947

Tasmanian Forest Administration  

Current government administration of the forest estate is by Forestry Tasmania.

Districts
The older administrative regions were:
 North West Region
 Smithton (1)
 Burnie (2)
 Queenstown (3)
 Devonport (4)
 North East Region
 Deloraine (5)
 Launceston (6)
 Scottsdale (7)
 Fingal (8)
 South East Region
 Norfolk (9)
 Triabunna (10)
 Geeveston (11)

Exemption from Freedom of Information Act and subsequent repeal

After the passage of the Forestry Amendment (Forestry Corporation) Act 1994, the Tasmanian forest industry became exempt from requests to provide disclosure of sensitive public information under the Freedom of Information Act signed into legislation in 1991. This was done through the addition of section 32A into the Act expressly exempting Forestry Tasmania and the Forestry Corporation from requests under this law.

A later Bill of Parliament introduced into law in 2004 repealed section 32A of the Freedom of Information, thus reverting the exemption granted in 1994.

2010
The current administrative areas are:
 Murchison (formerly 1, 2, 3)
 Mersey (formerly 4, 5)
 Bass (formerly  6, 7, 8)
 Derwent (formerly 9, 10)
 Huon (formerly 11)

See also
 Forests of Australia
Forests Commission Victoria
Forestry in New Zealand
 Woodchipping in Australia
 Forestry Tasmania
 Upper Florentine Valley
 Gunns Limited
 Tasmanian Forests Intergovernmental Agreement

Notes

Forestry in Australia
Economy of Tasmania
Tasmanian forests